The Grammy Award for Best Comedy Album is presented by the National Academy of Recording Arts and Sciences of the United States to "honor artistic achievement in comedy." The award was awarded yearly from 1959 to 1993 and then from 2004 to present day.

History
There have been several minor changes to the name of the award over this time:

From 1959 to 1967 it was Best Comedy Performance
From 1968 to 1991 it was known as Best Comedy Recording
From 1992 to 1993 and from 2004 to the present day it was awarded as Best Comedy Album

In 1960 and 1961 two separate awards were presented for the best spoken and for the best musical comedy performance.

In 1994, after four consecutive years of wins by classical music comedy albums, the award was restricted to spoken word comedy albums and moved into the "spoken" field. From then through 2003, it was awarded as the Grammy Award for Best Spoken Comedy Album.

In 2004 the award was reinstated within the comedy field as the Grammy Award for Best Comedy Album, once again allowing musical comedy works to be considered.

Bill Cosby holds the record for most consecutive wins, with six earned between 1965 and 1970. Peter Schickele (of P.D.Q. Bach fame) is the runner-up, with four wins between 1990 and 1993.

Recipients

Artists with multiple wins

7 wins
 Bill Cosby

5 wins
 George Carlin
 Richard Pryor

4 wins
 Dave Chappelle
 Peter Schickele
 Robin Williams

3 wins
 Chris Rock
 Louis C.K. 
 "Weird Al" Yankovic

2 wins
 Lewis Black
 Steve Martin

Artists with multiple nominations

16 nominations
 George Carlin

13 nominations
 Bill Cosby

10 nominations
 Richard Pryor
 "Weird Al" Yankovic

8 nominations
 Jonathan Winters

7 nominations
 Jim Gaffigan
 Patton Oswalt

6 nominations
 Lewis Black
 Cheech & Chong
 Stan Freberg
 Kathy Griffin
 Garrison Keillor
 Robin Williams

5 nominations
 Louis C.K.
 Steve Martin
 Peter Schickele
 Flip Wilson

4 nominations
 Mel Brooks
 Dave Chappelle
 Margaret Cho
 Jeff Foxworthy
 Al Franken
 Homer and Jethro
 Carl Reiner
 Chris Rock

3 nominations
 Erma Bombeck
 Lenny Bruce
 Rodney Dangerfield
 Bob Elliott
 The Firesign Theatre
 Flight of the Conchords
 Ray Goulding
 George Lopez
 Elaine May
 Dennis Miller
 Monty Python
 National Lampoon
 Mike Nichols
 Adam Sandler
 Jerry Seinfeld
 Allan Sherman
 Lily Tomlin

2 nominations
 Shelley Berman
 Archie Campbell
 David Cross
 Ellen DeGeneres
 Jimmy Fallon
 Craig Ferguson
 David Frye
 Whoopi Goldberg
 Kevin Hart
 Sam Kinison
 Robert Klein
 Lisa Lampanelli
 Larry the Cable Guy
 Jackie Mason
 Eddie Murphy
 Bob Newhart
 Tig Notaro
 Don Rickles
 Mort Sahl
 Harry Shearer
 Sarah Silverman
 Smothers Brothers
 Ray Stevens
 Judy Tenuta
 Ron White
 Steven Wright

References

External links 
Official Site of the Grammy Awards

 
Comedy Album
American comedy and humor awards
Album awards